A Crime for All Seasons is a 1997 studio album by industrial disco band My Life with the Thrill Kill Kult.

Recording
A Crime for All Seasons was the band's first album for Red Ant Entertainment. It was recorded and mixed at Starlust Studios, Los Angeles.

Release
A Crime for All Seasons was originally released by Red Ant Entertainment as a promotional cassette in 1996, followed by its official release on CD and cassette on June 10, 1997. It was later reissued on Rykodisc in 2000 with the additional remix "Sexy Sucker (Juicey Mix)".

Touring
The band toured the U.S. in support of the album from June to July 1997. The live lineup of the A Crime 4 All Seasons Tour included Groovie Mann, Buzz McCoy, Levi Levi, James Fury, Davey Dasher, and Curse.

Track listing

Credits
 Design – McCoy, Mann
 Performer – The Bomb Gang Girlz, Thrill Kill Kult
 Producer – Buzz McCoy
 Remix – Buzz McCoy
 Written by – Thrill Kill Kult

References

External links

1997 albums
My Life with the Thrill Kill Kult albums